Terepai Maea (born May 14, 1967) is a former boxer who competed for the Cook Islands.

Maea competed at the 1988 Summer Olympics in Seoul. He entered the lightweight division and received a bye in the first round. In the second round he was up against Mark Kennedy from Jamaica; the referee stopped the contest at the end of the first round due to Maea being outclassed.

References

External links
 

1967 births
Living people
Featherweight boxers
Boxers at the 1988 Summer Olympics
Cook Island male boxers
Olympic boxers of the Cook Islands